Les Greatest Hits is Army of Lovers fifth album. It is a compilation of the previous albums and three new songs: "Give My Life", "Venus And Mars" and "Requiem".

Overview
Two versions of the album were brought out, released in 1995 and 1996 respectively. They contain the same tracklisting, except for one song: on the 1996 version "Stand Up for Myself" was replaced with a new song, "King Midas", which also served as a last single of the group in the summer of 1996. 

This album also announced the return of La Camilla to the band (as a replacement of Michaela de la Cour, who left the band).

Track listing

Chart performance
In Sweden, Les Greatest Hits peaked at 40.

References 

Army of Lovers compilation albums
1995 greatest hits albums
Stockholm Records compilation albums